Weston is a city in Umatilla County, Oregon, United States. It was originally a post office called Mitchell's Station, established in February 1867. In September 1869, T.T. Lieuallen renamed the post office after his hometown, Weston, Missouri. The population was 667 at the 2010 census. It is part of the Pendleton–Hermiston Micropolitan Statistical Area.

History 
Weston was incorporated by the Oregon Legislative Assembly on October 19, 1878.

Weston is best known for its connection with novelist Nard Jones (1904–1972), who lived in the city with his parents between 1919 and 1927, and whose first novel Oregon Detour was set in an Oregon town of 600 inhabitants called "Creston".  When his novel, written according to the tenets of the New Realism literary movement (established years before by Sherwood Anderson, Sinclair Lewis and others) was published in 1930, many of the residents were convinced that his characters were based on local inhabitants, and considered the work a slander against the town.  While the legend that Jones was sued and ran out of town for his book is not true, members of the town made an effort to locally suppress access to the book: copies of the novel were stolen from the local library; after the novel became the subject for a high school student's book report, his English teacher removed the book from both the reading list and the high school library. According to George Venn, local literary historian, even in the 1980s, "trying to figure out or trying to remember who the 'real people' in the novel is still a local pastime."

Geography
Weston is located at the foot of the Blue Mountains, on Pine Creek.

Climate
This region experiences warm (but not hot) and dry summers, with no average monthly temperatures above .  According to the Köppen Climate Classification system, Weston has a warm-summer Mediterranean climate, abbreviated "Csb" on climate maps.

Demographics

2010 census
As of the census of 2010, there were 667 people, 252 households, and 171 families residing in the city. The racial makeup of the city was 83.5% White, 0.3% African American, 3.4% Native American, 3.1% Asian, 5.8% from other races, and 3.7% from two or more races. Hispanic or Latino of any race were 8.5% of the population.

There were 252 households, of which 34.5% had children under the age of 18 living with them, 46.0% were married couples living together, 10.3% had a female householder with no husband present, 11.5% had a male householder with no wife present, and 32.1% were non-families. 27.0% of all households were made up of individuals, and 13.9% had someone living alone who was 65 years of age or older. The average household size was 2.65 and the average family size was 3.12.

The median age in the city was 39.5 years. 25.8% of residents were under the age of 18; 6.4% were between the ages of 18 and 24; 25.3% were from 25 to 44; 26.8% were from 45 to 64; and 15.6% were 65 years of age or older. The gender makeup of the city was 52.0% male and 48.0% female.

2000 census
As of the census of 2000, there were 717 people, 265 households, and 191 families residing in the city. The population density was 1,318.7 people per square mile (512.7/km). There were 280 housing units at an average density of 515.0 per square mile (200.2/km). The racial makeup of the city was 83.40% White, 3.35% Native American, 10.88% from other races, and 2.37% from two or more races. Hispanic or Latino of any race were 15.76% of the population.

There were 265 households, out of which 32.8% had children under the age of 18 living with them, 54.3% were married couples living together, 8.7% had a female householder with no husband present, and 27.9% were non-families. 25.3% of all households were made up of individuals, and 11.3% had someone living alone who was 65 years of age or older. The average household size was 2.71 and the average family size was 3.18.

In the city, the population was spread out, with 28.2% under the age of 18, 6.8% from 18 to 24, 27.1% from 25 to 44, 25.0% from 45 to 64, and 13.0% who were 65 years of age or older. The median age was 37 years. For every 100 females, there were 97.5 males. For every 100 females age 18 and over, there were 97.3 males.

The median income for a household in the city was $36,905, and the median income for a family was $39,063. Males had a median income of $25,682 versus $21,625 for females. The per capita income for the city was $13,089. About 10.0% of families and 12.9% of the population were below the poverty line, including 14.2% of those under age 18 and 14.3% of those age 65 or over.

References

External links

 Listing for Weston in the Oregon Blue Book
 Weston, Oregon Genealogy project
 Weston, R. Gess Smith

Cities in Oregon
Cities in Umatilla County, Oregon
Pendleton–Hermiston Micropolitan Statistical Area
1867 establishments in Oregon
Populated places established in 1867